Sergio Daniel Escudero (born 12 April 1983 in Punta Alta, Buenos Aires) is an Argentine football left winger or left back.

Career 
Escudero started his career in 2003 playing for Racing de Olavarría in the regionalised 4th division of Argentine football. In 2004, he joined Alvarado de Mar del Plata in the same league.

In 2005 Escudero was signed by Olimpo de Bahía Blanca of the Argentine Primera. The club were relegated at the end of the 2005–2006 season after losing a playoff with Club Atlético Belgrano.

Escudero stayed with Olimpo and helped the club to win the Apertura 2006  tournament, setting them on their way towards promotion back to the Primera. In 2007, he was signed by Independiente but he only played 7 league games for the club before moving on to join Argentinos Juniors.

On 22 December 2008 left Argentinos Juniors for 1,4 million euros for the co-ownership, to Corinthians. After several weak performances, he returned to Argentinos in June 2010.

Honours
Olimpo de Bahía Blanca
Primera B Nacional: Apertura 2006

Coritiba
Campeonato Paranaense: 2013

References

External links
Football lineups player profile
Argentine Primera statistics at Futbol XXI  
 

1983 births
Living people
Sportspeople from Buenos Aires Province
Argentine footballers
Association football midfielders
Olimpo footballers
Club Atlético Independiente footballers
Argentinos Juniors footballers
Sport Club Corinthians Paulista players
Coritiba Foot Ball Club players
Criciúma Esporte Clube players
Racing de Olavarría footballers
Club Atlético Alvarado players
Club Atlético Belgrano footballers
Quilmes Atlético Club footballers
Argentino de Quilmes players
Deportivo Español footballers
Primera B Metropolitana players
Argentine Primera División players
Campeonato Brasileiro Série A players
Argentine expatriate footballers
Expatriate footballers in Brazil
Argentine expatriate sportspeople in Brazil